Leontosaurus is an extinct genus of non-mammalian synapsids from the Dicynodon Assemblage Zone, Balfour Formation of South Africa. It contains the single species L. vanderhorsti.

See also 
 List of synapsids

References 

Gorgonopsia
Prehistoric therapsid genera
Lopingian genera
Permian synapsids of Africa
Fossils of South Africa
Fossil taxa described in 1950